Max Emerson (born September 7, 1988) is an American actor, model, author, director and YouTuber. He is known for his modelling and social media profile, particularly on Instagram, and he wrote and directed the movie Hooked. He has appeared on TV in small roles, including the season 5 finale of Glee.

Early life and education 
Emerson was born in Vero Beach, Florida and studied for a BFA in performance and directing at the University of Miami, from which he graduated in 2009.

Career

Modeling 
Emerson began modeling while he was a student, when he signed up with the agency Wilhelmina Models. He works with agencies including Wilhelmina (New York), LA Models, Established Models (London), Heffner Management (Seattle), Next Management (Miami) and Factor Chosen (Chicago).

Filmmaking 
He wrote, produced, co-directed and acted in two short films, DipSpit and Earwig, which were shown for the first time at the Miami Gay and Lesbian Film Festival on April 26, 2011. Earwig is a drama about a closeted gay college student, while DipSpit is a comedy about two straight male models who get kicked out and move in with a gay college student.

In October 2015, Emerson announced his intention to produce an independent film called "Hooked" for which he had written the story, telling the story of a homeless gay prostitute called Jack and addressing the problems faced by homeless LGBT youth. He aimed to raise $150,000 for the project via Indiegogo and give half of any profits made to charities benefiting LGBT people. The launch video for the Indiegogo campaign featured Todrick Hall and musician Tom Goss. As part of it he released a single with Goss called "Not Enough". The campaign was supported by Out magazine.

Hooked had its world premiere at NewFest: The New York LGBT Film Festival on June 26, 2017, and its European premiere at the 7th Homochron film festival in Cologne on October 20 the same year. The Los Angeles Times gave it a negative review, however, audience review scores remain high

Acting 
As well as acting in Earwig and DipSpit, Emerson has appeared in single episodes of the TV series Glee (the season 5 finale The Untitled Rachel Berry Project), Hit the Floor, The Real O'Neals and Eastsiders, and of the web series Coffee House Chronicles and the movie made from it.

From September 7 to September 24, 2017, he starred as Mitchell in Douglas Carter Beane's comedy play The Little Dog Laughed at the Red House Arts Center in Syracuse, New York. A local reviewer said each of the four actors in the play "brings a memorable, engaging performance", and that Emerson "delivers the role of a sweet, confused, and occasionally thoughtless young star with sensitivity and kindness".

Writing 
Emerson wrote an autobiography, Hot Sissy – Life Before Flashbulbs, describing his teenage years growing up in a "redneck" area of Florida. Hot Sissy was released as an e-book and in a limited print run of 500 hardcover copies in December 2014. The limited editions were each signed and came with an original Polaroid picture.

Personal life 
In June 2016, he publicly introduced his boyfriend, Andrés Camilo, an officer in the US Army, in a YouTube video.
Emerson has an active social media presence and posts regularly on YouTube where his username is "TheMaxVicious".  he has 1 million followers on Instagram (@maxisms) and 19,500 on Twitter (@TheMaxisms). On YouTube and on social media, Emerson is known for his humour and for showing off his body.

In May 2017, French comic TV presenter Cyril Hanouna used one of Emerson's torso pictures to set up a catfishing profile on a gay dating site, and tricked the men who responded to the profile into revealing sexual fantasies to him while he was live on his show Touche pas à mon poste !. The segment triggered nearly 20,000 complaints to regulators and condemnation from LGBT groups.

In April 2022, Emerson served as the Grand Marshal of the Miami Beach Gay Pride.

Filmography

References

External links 
 
 

1988 births
Living people
Male models from Florida
People from Vero Beach, Florida
American gay actors
Male actors from Miami
Gay models
LGBT YouTubers
LGBT people from Florida
20th-century LGBT people
21st-century LGBT people
American gay writers